Lise Lindstrom is an American operatic soprano. She is best known for the title role of Puccini's Turandot and also highly recognized in the dramatic repertory of Richard Strauss and Richard Wagner.

Early life
Lindstrom, whose grandfather was a Norwegian immigrant from Stavanger, was born in Alameda, California. She moved to Sonora, where she was raised, when she was 5. After graduating from Sonora High School in 1983, she entered San Francisco State University from which she graduated with bachelor of arts degree. During the time, she took additional voice lessons with Blanche Thebom and sang her first onstage role, Donna Anna in Don Giovanni with the Berkeley Opera alongside her father as the Commendatore. Lindstrom proceeded musical studies at the San Francisco Conservatory of Music and earned the degree in 1995. After graduation she moved to New York City, managing to make a living by taking temporary jobs while auditioning for agency and artist programs, which made little success.

Career
In 2003 Lindstrom finally launched her career when contacted by Jerome Shannon, then General Director of Mobile Opera, to perform the title role of Turandot.

She came to prominence when she replaced Maria Guleghina as Turandot in November 2009, making her the Metropolitan Opera debut.

Lindstrom made her role debut in the title role of August Everding's 2015 production of Richard Strauss's Elektra at the Hamburg State Opera with Simone Young conducting. In 2017, she debuted at the Theater an der Wien as Marie in Wozzeck.

References

External links

Performance schedule, Operabase

Year of birth missing (living people)
Living people
People from Sonora, California
American operatic sopranos
American people of Norwegian descent
San Francisco State University alumni
San Francisco Conservatory of Music alumni
21st-century American women opera singers
Helpmann Award winners
Singers from California
Classical musicians from California